The Life and Death of King John, a history play by William Shakespeare, dramatises the reign of John, King of England (ruled 1199–1216), the son of Henry II of England and Eleanor of Aquitaine and the father of Henry III of England. It is believed to have been written in the mid-1590s, but it was not published until 1623, when it appeared in the First Folio.


Characters 

 King John – King of England
 Eleanor – the Queen Mother, widow of Henry II
 Prince Henry – his son, later King Henry III
 Blanche of Castile – John's niece
 Earl of Essex – an English nobleman
 Earl of Salisbury – an English nobleman
 Earl of Pembroke – an English nobleman
 Lord Bigot – Earl of Norfolk
 Peter of Pomfret – a prophet
 Philip Faulconbridge – also known as Philip the Bastard and Sir Richard the Plantagenet; natural son of Richard I of England
 Robert Faulconbridge – his half brother; legitimate son of Sir Robert Faulconbridge
 Lady Faulconbridge – their mother; widow of Sir Robert Faulconbridge
 James Gurney – her attendant
 Lady Constance – widow of Geoffrey II, Duke of Brittany
 Prince Arthur – her son, King John's nephew, claimant to the English throne and eventual Duke of Brittany

 Sheriff
 Two Executioners
 English Herald
 English Messenger
 King Philip – King of France
 Louis the Dauphin – his son
 Viscount of Melun
 Châtillon – French ambassador to England
 Hubert – citizen of Angiers and later a follower of King John
 Citizen of Angiers
 French Herald
 French Messenger
 Limoges, Duke of Austria (composite of Widomar, Viscount of Limoges and Leopold V, Duke of Austria)
 Cardinal Pandolf – legate from Pope Innocent III
 Lords, soldiers, attendants etc.

Synopsis 

King John receives an ambassador from France who demands with a threat of war that he renounce his throne in favour of his nephew, Arthur, whom the French King Philip believes to be the rightful heir to the throne under primogeniture.

John adjudicates an inheritance dispute between Robert Faulconbridge and his older brother Philip the Bastard, during which it becomes apparent that Philip is the illegitimate son of King Richard I. Queen Eleanor, mother to both Richard I and John, recognises the family resemblance in Philip and suggests that he renounce his claim to the Faulconbridge land in exchange for a knighthood. John knights Philip the Bastard under the name Sir Richard the Plantagenet. Afterwards, Lady Faulconbridge confirms her son's secret parentage in private.

In France, King Philip and his forces besiege the English-ruled town of Angers, threatening attack unless its citizens support Arthur. Philip is supported by Austria, whom the characters believe killed Richard I. The English contingent arrives. Eleanor then trades insults with Constance, Arthur's mother. Kings Philip and John stake their claims in front of Angers' citizens, but to no avail: their representative says that they will support the rightful king, whoever that turns out to be.

The French and English armies clash, but no clear victor emerges. Each army dispatches a herald claiming victory, but Angers' citizens continue to refuse to recognize either claimant because neither army has proven victorious.

Philip the Bastard proposes that the armies of England and France unite against Angers. The citizens suggest an alternative proposal: that Philip's son, Louis the Dauphin, should marry John's niece Blanche. The proposal would give John a stronger claim to the throne while Louis would gain territory for France. Though a furious Constance accuses Philip of abandoning the claims of Prince Arthur, Louis and Blanche are married.

Cardinal Pandolf arrives from Pope Innocent III bearing a formal accusation that John is blocking the Pope's chosen Archbishop, Stephen Langton, from the Diocese of Canterbury and has further imposed Caesaropapism upon the Catholic Church in England. John defies the Holy See and vows that "No Italian priest shall tithe or toll in our dominions", whereupon the Cardinal declares him excommunicated and deposed as King. Pandolf demands that the French king renounce the new treaty, though Philip is hesitant, having just established family ties with John. Pandolf points out that Philip's links to the Vatican are older and firmer.

Battle breaks out; the Duke of Austria is beheaded by the Bastard in revenge for his father's death; and both Angers and Prince Arthur are captured by John's army. Eleanor is left in charge of the Angevin Empire in France, while the Bastard is sent to extort funds from English monasteries. John secretly orders Hubert to kill Arthur. Pandolf informs Louis that he now has as strong a claim to the English throne as Arthur or John, and Louis agrees to invade England.

[[File:'King John', Act IV, Scene 1, Hubert and Arthur (from the Boydell series) James Northcote (1746–1831) Royal Shakespeare Theatre.jpg|thumb|left|"King John", Act IV, Scene 1, Hubert and Arthur (from the Boydell series), James Northcote (1789)]]
Hubert is reluctant to blind and kill Prince Arthur and spares him in secret. The English nobility demand Arthur's release. John agrees, but Hubert then tells him that Arthur is dead. The nobles, believing the Prince was murdered, defect to Louis' side. Equally upsetting, and more heartbreaking to John, is the news of his mother's death, along with that of Lady Constance. The Bastard reports that the monasteries are unhappy about John's attempt to steal their lands and gold. Hubert has a furious argument with John, during which he reveals that Arthur is still alive. John, delighted, sends him to report the news to the nobles.

Arthur dies jumping from a castle wall during an escape attempt. The nobles find his body, believe he was murdered by John, and refuse to believe Hubert's entreaties. A defeated John surrenders his crown to Pandolf, who reverses John's excommunication and gives the crown back in return for restored Papal control over the English Church. John orders the Bastard, one of his few remaining loyal subjects, to lead the English army against the invading forces from France.

While John's former noblemen swear allegiance to Louis, Pandolf arrived and explains that John has submitted to the Holy See, but Louis refuses to call off his invasion of England and is accordingly excommunicated by the Cardinal. The Bastard arrives with an English army and threatens Louis, but to no avail. War breaks out with substantial losses on each side, including Louis' reinforcements, who are drowned during the sea crossing. Many English nobles return to John's side after a dying French nobleman, Melun, warns them that Louis plans to kill them all after his victory.

John is poisoned offstage by a monk, whose loyalties and motivations are left unexplained. His nobles gather around him as he dies. The Bastard plans a second assault on Louis' forces, until he learns that Cardinal Pandolf has negotiated a peace treaty. The English nobility swears allegiance to John's son Prince Henry, who reflects that civil war is just as perilous to England as foreign invasion.

 Sources King John is closely related to an anonymous history play, The Troublesome Reign of King John (c. 1589), the "masterly construction" the infelicitous expression of which led Peter Alexander to argue that Shakespeare's was the earlier play. E. A. J. Honigmann elaborated these arguments, both in his preface to the second Arden edition of King John, and in his 1982 monograph on Shakespeare's influence on his contemporaries. The majority view, however, first advanced in a rebuttal of Honigmann's views by Kenneth Muir, holds that the Troublesome Reign antedates King John by a period of several years; and that the skilful plotting of the Troublesome Reign is neither unparalleled in the period, nor proof of Shakespeare's involvement.

Shakespeare derived from Holinshed's Chronicles certain verbal collocations and points of action. Honigmann discerned in the play the influence of John Foxe's Acts and Monuments, Matthew Paris' Historia Maior, and the Latin Wakefield Chronicle, but Muir demonstrated that this apparent influence could be explained by the priority of the Troublesome Reign, which contains similar or identical matter.

 Date and text 

The date of composition is unknown, but must lie somewhere between 1587, the year of publication of the second, revised edition of Holinshed's Chronicles, upon which Shakespeare drew for this and other plays, and 1598, when King John was mentioned among Shakespeare's plays in the Palladis Tamia of Francis Meres. The editors of the Oxford Shakespeare conclude from the play's incidence of rare vocabulary, use of colloquialisms in verse, pause patterns, and infrequent rhyming that the play was composed in 1596, after Richard II but before Henry IV, Part I.King John is one of only two plays by Shakespeare that are entirely written in verse, the other being Richard II.

 Performance history 

The earliest known performance took place in 1737, when John Rich staged a production at the Theatre Royal, Drury Lane. In 1745, the year of the Jacobite rebellion, competing productions were staged by Colley Cibber at Covent Garden and David Garrick at Drury Lane. Charles Kemble's 1823 production made a serious effort at historical accuracy, inaugurating the 19th century tradition of striving for historical accuracy in Shakespearean production. Other successful productions of the play were staged by William Charles Macready (1842) and Charles Kean (1846). Twentieth century revivals include Robert B. Mantell's 1915 production (the last production to be staged on Broadway) and Peter Brook's 1945 staging, featuring Paul Scofield as the Bastard.

In the Victorian era, King John was one of Shakespeare's most frequently staged plays, in part because its spectacle and pageantry were congenial to Victorian audiences. King John, however, has decreased in popularity: it is now one of Shakespeare's least-known plays and stagings of it are very rare. It has been staged four times on Broadway, the last time in 1915. It has also been staged five times from 1953 to 2014 at the Stratford Shakespeare Festival.

Herbert Beerbohm Tree made a silent film version in 1899 entitled King John. It is a short film consisting of the King's death throes in Act V, Scene vii and is the earliest surviving film adaptation of a Shakespearean play. King John has been produced for television twice: in 1951 with Donald Wolfit and in 1984 with Leonard Rossiter as part of the BBC Television Shakespeare series of adaptations.

George Orwell specifically praised the play in 1942 for its view of politics: "When I had read it as a boy it seemed to me archaic, something dug out of a history book and not having anything to do with our own time. Well, when I saw it acted, what with its intrigues and doublecrossings, non-aggression pacts, quislings, people changing sides in the middle of a battle, and what-not, it seemed to me extraordinarily up to date."

 Selected recent revivals 
The Royal Shakespeare Company based in Stratford-upon-Avon presented three productions of King John: in 2006 directed by Josie Rourke as part of their Complete Works Festival, in 2012 directed by Maria Aberg who cast a woman, Pippa Nixon, in the role of the Bastard, and in 2020, directed by Eleanor Rhode and with a woman, Rosie Sheehy, cast in the role of King John. The company's 1974–5 production was heavily rewritten by director John Barton, who included material from The Troublesome Reign of King John, John Bale King Johan (thought to be Shakespeare's own sources) and other works.

The Oregon Shakespeare Festival has staged the play several times, most recently in 2022 in a production with a cast of women and non-binary actors.

The Chicago Shakespeare Theater on Navy Pier presented the play in its 1990-1991 season and again in 2003-2004.

In 2008, the Hudson Shakespeare Company of New Jersey produced King John'' as part of their annual Shakespeare in the Parks series. Director Tony White set the action in the medieval era but used a multi-ethnic and gender swapping cast. The roles of Constance and Dauphin Lewis were portrayed by African American actors Tzena Nicole Egblomasse and Jessie Steward and actresses Sharon Pinches and Allison Johnson were used in several male roles. Another notable departure for the production is the depiction of King John himself, often portrayed as an ineffectual king. Actor Jimmy Pravasilis portrayed John as a headstrong monarch sticking to his guns on his right to rule, whose unwillingness to compromise caused his downfall.

New York's Theater for a New Audience presented a "remarkable" in-the-round production in 2000, emphasising Faulconbridge's introduction to court realpolitik to develop the audience's own awareness of the characters' motives. The director was Karin Coonrod.

In 2012, Bard on the Beach in Vancouver, British Columbia put on a production. It was also performed as part of the 2013 season at the Utah Shakespeare Festival, recipient of America's Outstanding Regional Theatre Tony Award (2000), presented by the American Theatre Wing and the League of American Theatres and Producers.

The play was presented at Shakespeare's Globe, directed by James Dacre, as part of the summer season 2015 in the 800th anniversary year of Magna Carta. A co-production with Royal & Derngate, this production also played in Salisbury Cathedral, Temple Church and The Holy Sepulchre, Northampton.

The Rose Theatre, Kingston upon Thames, Surrey hosted Sir Trevor Nunn's direction of the play during May and June 2016, in the quatercentenary year of Shakespeare's death and the 800th anniversary year of King John's death.

The Worcester Repertory Company staged a production of the play (directed by Ben Humphrey) in 2016 around the tomb of King John in Worcester Cathedral on the 800th anniversary of the King's death. King John was played by Phil Leach.

See also 
 Blank verse
 Illegitimacy in fiction
 Gild the lily

Notes

Citations

Sources

External links 

 
 
 Complete Text of King John at MIT
 The life and death of King John – HTML version of this title.
 

1598 plays
British plays adapted into films
Cultural depictions of English monarchs
English Renaissance plays
Plays set in the 12th century
Plays set in the 13th century
Cultural depictions of John, King of England
Plays about English royalty
Plays set in England
Shakespearean histories